Miletus rosei is a butterfly in the family Lycaenidae. It is found in northern Sulawesi.

References

Butterflies described in 1995
Miletus (butterfly)